Asb Mirza (also Romanized as Asb Mīrzā) is a village in Baryaji Rural District, in the Central District of Sardasht County, West Azerbaijan Province, Iran. At the 2006 census, its population was 111, in 24 families.

References 

Populated places in Sardasht County